Yoshihiro Fujita (born October 24, 1969) is a Japanese mixed martial artist. He competed in the Bantamweight division.

Mixed martial arts record

|-
| Loss
| align=center| 2-6-1
| Hiroyuki Tanaka
| Decision (unanimous)
| Shooto 2003: 6/27 in Hiroshima Sun Plaza
| 
| align=center| 2
| align=center| 5:00
| Hiroshima, Japan
| 
|-
| Loss
| align=center| 2-5-1
| Ichaku Murata
| Submission (guillotine choke)
| Shooto: To The Top 7
| 
| align=center| 1
| align=center| 1:08
| Osaka, Japan
| 
|-
| Loss
| align=center| 2-4-1
| Seiji Ozuka
| Decision (unanimous)
| Shooto: Gig East 2
| 
| align=center| 2
| align=center| 5:00
| Tokyo, Japan
| 
|-
| Win
| align=center| 2-3-1
| Katsuhisa Akasaki
| Submission (kimura)
| Shooto: Gig East 1
| 
| align=center| 1
| align=center| 5:00
| Tokyo, Japan
| 
|-
| Win
| align=center| 1-3-1
| Koichi Tanaka
| Technical Submission (armbar)
| Shooto: Gig West 1
| 
| align=center| 1
| align=center| 3:58
| Osaka, Japan
| 
|-
| Draw
| align=center| 0-3-1
| Masashi Kameda
| Draw
| Shooto: R.E.A.D. 8
| 
| align=center| 2
| align=center| 5:00
| Osaka, Japan
| 
|-
| Loss
| align=center| 0-3
| Yoshiyuki Takayama
| Decision (majority)
| Shooto: Gig '98 2nd
| 
| align=center| 2
| align=center| 5:00
| Tokyo, Japan
| 
|-
| Loss
| align=center| 0-2
| Masahiro Oishi
| Technical Submission (kimura)
| Shooto: Las Grandes Viajes 2
| 
| align=center| 1
| align=center| 2:40
| Tokyo, Japan
| 
|-
| Loss
| align=center| 0-1
| Mitsuo Matsumoto
| Decision (unanimous)
| Lumax Cup: Tournament of J '97 Lightweight Tournament
| 
| align=center| 2
| align=center| 3:00
| Japan
|

See also
List of male mixed martial artists

References

1969 births
Japanese male mixed martial artists
Bantamweight mixed martial artists
Living people